Robin Haase and Matwé Middelkoop were the defending champions, but lost to Jeevan Nedunchezhiyan and Purav Raja in the quarterfinals.

Nikola Mektić and Jürgen Melzer won the title, defeating Hsieh Cheng-peng and Christopher Rungkat in the final, 6–2, 4–6, [10–2].

Seeds

Draw

Draw

References

External links
 Main Draw

Sofia Open
Sofia Open